Uttar Bedkashi Union is a union parishad of Koyra Upazila of Khulna District, in Khulna Division, Bangladesh.

Geography
It is the smallest union of Koyra Upazila.

Administrative area 
Uttar Bedkashi union consists of a mouza / village. The mouza is divided into 9 administrative wards.

The villages are:

 Ward no. 1 – Kathmarchar, Jalalipara
 Ward no. 2 – Dighirpar, Pathaghata Shikaripara, Kacharibari
 Ward no. 3 – Sheikh Sardar Para, Nonadighirpar
 Ward no. 4 – Borobari, Katkata, Kashikhalpar
 Ward no. 5 – Pathorkhali, 
 Ward no. 6 – Jhileghata
 Ward no. 7 – Gazipara
 Ward no. 8 – Shakbaria, Gabbunia
 Ward no. 9 – Padmapukur

Again, there are elected women representatives (female members of the council) in every three wards. They are reporting the elected representatives (chairman of the council). The council also has one recruited secretary, village police.

Population 
According to the latest census, the total population of Gunner union was 15,225.

Rivers
 Kapotaksha River
 Shakbaria River

Education
 Bedkashi Collegiate School
 Bedkashi Habibia Dakhil Madrasa
 Kapotakshma Secondary School
 Borobari Secondary School
 Borobari Government Primary School
 Bedkashi Government Primary School

Economics 
The economy of Uttar Bedkashi Union is largely dependent on agriculture and fisheries.

References

Unions of Koyra Upazila
Populated places in Khulna District